Bridgeville   is a community in the Canadian province of Nova Scotia, located in  Pictou County. It is on Nova Scotia Route 348 and the East River of Pictou.

Though now sparsely populated, Bridgeville was the scene of substantial iron mining operations in the nineteenth century.

External links
  Goethite specimen found in Bridgeville (Natural History Museum of Los Angeles)

References

Mining communities in Nova Scotia
Communities in Pictou County